The 1999 Arab Super Cup was an international club competition played by the winners and runners up of the Arab Club Champions Cup and Arab Cup Winners' Cup. It was the sixth edition and was won by Algerian side MC Oran.

Teams

Results and standings

Awards and statistics

Awards
Best player
 Kouider Boukessassa

Best goalkeeper
 Reda Acimi

Best goalscorer
 Kouider Boukessassa
 Ahmed Koussa

Fairplay team
 MC Oran

Top goalscorers

References

External links
Arab Super Cup 1999 - rsssf.com

1999
1999
1998–99 in Algerian football
1998–99 in Saudi Arabian football
1998–99 in Syrian football